The Play-offs of the 1997 Fed Cup Asia/Oceania Zone Group II were the final stages of the Group II Zonal Competition involving teams from Asia and Oceania. Using the positions determined in their pools, the eight teams faced off to determine their overall placing in the 1997 Fed Cup Asia/Oceania Zone Group II. The top two teams advanced to Group I for 1998.

Draw

First round

Pacific Oceania vs. Uzbekistan

Malaysia vs. Philippines

Singapore vs. Pakistan

Sri Lanka vs. Syria

Repechage Round

Pacific Oceania vs. Malaysia

Pakistan vs. Sri Lanka

Second round

Singapore vs. Syria

Final Placements

  and  advanced to Group I for 1998. They placed eighth and ninth overall respectively, and thus Philippines was demoted back to Group II for 1999.

See also
Fed Cup structure

References

External links
 Fed Cup website

1997 Fed Cup Asia/Oceania Zone